Certonardoa semiregularis is a species of sea star in the family Ophidiasteridae.

Description

This species has five, slender, tapering arms. There are regular, longitudinal and transverse rows on the dorsal side. The ventral side is paler than the dorsal side.

Distribution
This species is found in the East China Sea, in Japan, in particular, Honshu Island, Kyushu.

References

External links
 Distribution map

Ophidiasteridae
Starfish described in 1842